Bartosz Jurecki (born 31 January 1979) is a former Polish handball player who is currently the manager of Piotrkowianin Piotrków Trybunalski.

Career
He won silver in the 2007 World Men's Handball Championship and bronze in 2009. He was also a member of the Polish national team in the 2008 Summer Olympic Games, where Poland finished fifth and in the 2016 Summer Olympics where Poland took fourth place.

State awards
 2007  Gold Cross of Merit
 2015  Knight's Cross of Polonia Restituta

Private life
His younger brother Michał Jurecki is also a handball player.

References

1979 births
Living people
People from Kościan
Sportspeople from Greater Poland Voivodeship
Polish male handball players
Handball players at the 2008 Summer Olympics
Handball players at the 2016 Summer Olympics
Olympic handball players of Poland
Expatriate handball players
Polish expatriate sportspeople in Germany
SC Magdeburg players
Handball-Bundesliga players
Polish handball coaches